Dancing Diva is the eighth studio album by Taiwanese singer Jolin Tsai. It was released on May 12, 2006, by EMI and Mars. Produced by Adia, Paul Lee, Peter Lee, Paula Ma, Yuri Chan, and Stanley Huang, its musical style is mainly based on pop and electronic music, the slick dance songs with dazzling dance moves also reveal a strong exotic atmosphere. It was well received by music critics, who commented that it is variety in content and well produced, and has an extremely high listenability and popularity, which established Tsai's representative status as a dance-pop artist in the Chinese music scene.

The album sold more than 2.5 million copies in Asia. In Taiwan, it sold more than 300,000 copies, becoming the year's highest-selling album. The album earned three Golden Melody Award nominations, it was nominated for Best Mandarin Album, Tsai was nominated for Best Female Mandarin Singer, and Adia was nominated for Best Single Producer for "Dancing Diva". Eventually, she won Best Female Mandarin Singer and Favorite Female Singer/Group. Tsai embarked on her second concert tour Dancing Forever World Tour after the release of the album, which started on September 15, 2006 in Hong Kong, China and ended on February 8, 2009 in Uncasville, United States.

Background and development 
On December 21, 2005, it was revealed that Tsai had started collecting songs for her new album, which would be released in March or April 2006. On February 14, 2006, Tsai signed with EMI and announced that she had started recording her new album, which would be released on May 12, 2006, "EMI Capitol is a brand new environment, quite rich in music resources, giving me a lot of room to do what I want!" said Tsai. On February 22, 2006, Ashin revealed that he would write a song for Tsai's new album. On March 15, 2006, it was revealed that the recording progress of the album had reached 80 percent and Tsai had decided on the lead single.

On March 25, 2006, it was revealed that Tsai had finished the recording of the album and she would fly to Budapest, Hungary to film music video. On April 11, 2006, it was revealed that Tsai had written the lyrics of a song named "The Prologue", and her manager Howard Chiang said: "Jolin had written the lyrics in September last year, but it took a long time to find the right melody to fit it." On April 24, 2006, it was revealed that Tsai was in Los Angeles, United States learning choreography for "Pulchritude" and "Mr. Q". On April 28, 2006, it was revealed that Stanley Huang had written "Nice Guy" for the album.

Writing and recording 

"Dancing Diva" has a smooth rhythm and an exotic atmosphere, with strong rhythm and catchy lyrics. The lyrics of "Pretence" describe the helpless state of mind of a girl in the wronged feelings but still pretend to be good. The lyrics of "A Wonder in Madrid" visualize pure emotion through objects such as arc roof and red dance dress, and the crisp sound of xylophone reminds the audience of the beauty of youth. "Mr. Q" is an American style dance song, and she wrote the lyrics for the English rap part. "The Prologue" is a mildly sad and moving ballad about a couple who broke up and see each other again as friends.

The lyrics of "Pulchritude" describe the independent expression of fashion and emotion of women in the 21st century, which is women should not be attached to emotion and blindly follow the trend. "Nice Guy" is a rock song with heavy beat, which is performed together with Stanley Huang. "Love in the Shape of Love" is a beautiful lyrical song. The lyrics of "Heart Breaking Day" describe the lingering thoughts of parting and the opposite thoughts of challenging Valentine's Day. "The Finale" is a soulful ballad with heartfelt lyrics, and Tsai used a comfortable and soulful singing voice to perform the song. "Attraction of Sexy Lips" is a promotional song of Max Factor, and its strong rhythm is a perfect foil to her sexy image.

Title and artwork 
The title "Dancing Diva" not only literally means a woman who can dance, but also implies that a girl who transforms her energy and dances for her life. Tsai expressed that she hoped to show her own style through the music and performance of the album, in addition to lyrical songs made listeners feel empathy and touching, dynamic dance songs with dance moves also attracted attention and triggered topics. Tsai described the album is kind of autobiography, which dancers live by singing and dancing is the same as hers, she said: "dancing is an important part of my performance, it's also a part of my performance where I feel confident! This time will also bring new and incredible dance moves, so wait and see!" In the cover of the standard edition, Tsai wore a sheer shirt, a white bikini, short shorts, and knee-high socks, with holding a three feet ribbon, showing her power and grace.

Release and promotion 
On April 12, 2006, Tsai announced that the album would be released on May 12, 2006. On April 26, 2006, EMI announced that the album was available for pre-order today. On April 29, 2006, EMI announced that more than 100,000 copies had been pre-ordered within the first three days. On May 12, 2006, she held a press conference for the album release in Taipei, Taiwan, she said: "There are many different styles on this album so that it's hard to define what the specific genre is like, but it will definitely give you a fresh feeling, because there will be a lot of dance songs that I haven't tried before. In fact, some of my dance songs in the past were more electronic dance music, this time there are a lot of different genres, such as rock, more heavy rhythm things. I hope Dancing Diva will arouse people's interest and people will want to learn the dance moves and learn how to sing the songs." In its first week of release, the album topped the weekly album sales charts of G-Music and Five Music in Taiwan. On May 28, 2006, it was reported that the album had sold more than 1 million copies in Asia.

On June 20, 2006, she held an album celebration event in Taipei, Taiwan and announced that it had sold over 2 million copies in Asia. On July 1, 2006, she held the Pulchritude Concert in Kaohsiung, Taiwan. On July 7, 2006, she released the perfect celebration edition of the album, which additionally includes 11 music videos. On November 23, 2006, it was reported that the album had sold more than 2.5 million copies in Asia, while it had sold more than 230,000 copies in Taiwan, becoming the year's highest-selling album in the country. On January 12, 2007, the album reached number two on the album sales chart of 2006 of Five Music. On January 22, 2007, the album topped the album sales chart of 2006 of G-Music.

Live performances 
On April 24, 2006, Tsai participated in the 2005 Music Radio China Top Chart Award and sang "Attraction of Sexy Lips". On May 6, 2006, she participated in the 2006 MTV Asia Awards and sang "Dancing Diva". On May 26, 2006, she participated in the Golden Melody Orz Concert and sang "Dancing Diva", "Pretence", and "A Wonder in Madrid". On May 27, 2006, she participated in the Le Party and sang "Pretence", "A Wonder in Madrid", and "Dancing Diva". On May 30, 2006, she participated in the recording of the China TV television show Big Brother's Return and sang "Dancing Diva" and "Mr. Q". On June 4, 2006, she participated in the Qilu TV television show Fans Party and sang "Dancing Diva". On July 13, 2006, she participated in the 2006 Volunteer Beijing Concert and sang "Dancing Diva", "Mr. Q", and "A Wonder in Madrid". On July 21, 2006, she participated in the Z Pop Charity Concert and sang "Pulchritude", "Love in the Shape of Heart", "Dancing Diva", and "Mr. Q". On July 24, 2006, she participated in the recording of the Dragon TV television show Heaven and Earth Heroes Campus Tour and sang "Pulchritude", "A Wonder in Madrid", "Pretence", "Love in the Shape of Heart", "Dancing Diva", and "Mr. Q".

On July 25, 2006, she participated in the Summer Music Festival and sang "Dancing Diva", "Pretence", and "Mr. Q". On July 26, 2006, she held the Dancing Diva Sohu Online Concert in Beijing, China and sang "Pulchritude", "A Wonder in Madrid", "Pretence", "Dancing Diva", and "Mr. Q". On August 5, 2006, she participated in the Nine Planets Concert and sang "Mr. Q" and "A Wonder in Madrid". On August 6, 2006, she participated in the 2006 Metro Radio Mandarin Hits Music Awards and sang "Dancing Diva". On August 9, 2006, she participated in the TVB Jade television show Jade Solid Gold and sang "Dancing Diva" and "Mr. Q". On August 14, 2006, she participated in the My FM 8th Anniversary Music Magic Tour and sang "Pulchritude", "A Wonder in Madrid", "Dancing Diva", and "Mr. Q". On September 1, 2006, she participated in the MTV Mandarin Awards and sang "Dancing Diva", "Attraction of Sexy Lips", "Mr. Q", and "Pretence". Since then, Tsai has been performing songs from the album at various events.

Singles and music videos 

On April 26, 2006, Tsai released the single, "Dancing Diva". On April 27, 2006, she released the music video of "Dancing Diva", which was co-directed by Marlboro Lai and Bill Chia. The choreography in the music video is the "light wave dance," which combined reggae, hip hop, and Middle Eastern dance, and it maintains explosive power in soft, smooth movements through the power of hips and chest, in order to pursue different dance visual effects, she also integrated rhythmic gymnastics's ribbon in the music video. Tsai said: "I was watching television when I was out for promotion, I think the ribbon in gymnastics looks very nice, so I told my manager I want to learn and integrate into the dance in the future. And when the album was done, we thought we can put the ribbon in "Dancing Diva", she added: "Gymnastics is very hard, in fact, very scary, you have to force yourself to do different body training, Like pulling a leg 180 degrees. After every exercise, I was too tired to breathe."

On May 9, 2006, she released the music video of "Pretence", which was directed by Leste Chen. Tsai first tried the drama style music video, and its plot is very close to the real life, the beauty of the picture exudes a strong Shunji Iwai style. It tells the story of a girl who accidentally runs into her ex-boyfriend and his current girlfriend on the bus, and the ex-boyfriend's every move reminds the girl of the time when they were madly in love. On May 15, 2006, she released the music video of "A Wonder in Madrid", which was directed by Terry and friends, and it was filmed at Szentendre, Hungary. On June 30, 2006, she released the music video of "Mr. Q", which was directed by Kuang Sheng and features Hong Kong actor Edison Chen. On June 12, 2006, she released the music video of "The Prologue", which was directed by May Wen and features Taiwanese actor Waser Chou. On June 20, 2006, she released the music video of "Pulchritude", which was directed by Marlboro Lai. The background is mainly red color, and the lighting effect creates a shining atmosphere. The music video of "Nice Guy" was directed by Chen Hung-i, the music video of "Love in the Shape of Heart" and "Heart Breaking Day" were both directed by May Wen, the music video of "The Finale" was directed by JP Huang, and the music video of "Attraction of Sexy Lips" was directed by Marlboro Lai. "Dancing Diva" reached number 33 on the Hit FM Top 100 Singles of the Year chart of 2006, and "Pretence" and "A Wonder in Madrid" also reached number three and 14, respectively.

Touring 

On May 31, 2006, Tsai's manager Howard Chiang revealed that she would start her new concert tour in the second half of the year. On July 17, 2006, she announced that she would embark on the Dancing Forever World Tour at Hong Kong Coliseum on September 15, 2006. On June 8, 2007, she released the live video album and documentary If You Think You Can, You Can! for the tour. It chronicled the Taipei dates of the tour from November 17 to 19, 2006, a documentary film, and four music videos from Dancing Forever (2006). On February 8, 2009, it ended at the Mohegan Sun Arena in Uncasville, United States. The tour lasted two and a half years and held 28 shows in 20 cities in Asia, North America, and Oceania, having more than 500,000 audiences and earning more than NT$1 billion.

Critical reception 
Taiwan's Marie Claire stated: "Dancing Diva announced Jolin Tsai's evolution, in music and music video performance, Jolin Tsai's image of singing and dancing is becoming more and more stable, she went to the United States to study dance, she combined dance and gymnastics, bring amazing performance to music fans, she won her first Golden Melody's Best Female Mandarin Singer award, she was praised by the judges for "getting rid of the shackles and becoming a real singer", though she had been criticized by musicians as a "bad singer" years ago, now she proved her strong power with her strength." Chen Yuhao of Qianjiang Evening News commented: "Dancing Diva means a lot to Jolin Tsai. Strictly speaking, since this album, Jolin Tsai has really established her image as a dance music diva." Tencent Music's Yo! Bang stated: "The exotic music style, smooth and crisp rhythms, and Jolin Tsai's stunning dance performance have established her status as a dance music singer in the pop music scene." Tencent Entertainment's Shuwa commented: "One of the most striking features of Dancing Diva is the momentum, such momentum is not previously sought for Jolin Tsai's work. And such momentum is not only reflected in the outfit and dance, but also the music arrangement, in addition to the use of the past fashion and popular elements, the overwhelming arrangement in those dance songs on this album is the most profound. The ballads are no longer confined to the story of emotional accidents of little girls anymore, and the range extended to a more mature aspect. In terms of the production, Adia can be said that he has a very good grasp of Jolin Tsai's dance music and a very high sense of direction, so this album has a very high audibility and popularity." Sina Music's Stephan Lee commented: "Compared with her last album J-Game, Jolin's new album has made significant progress in terms of song quality, overall effect, performance, and breakthrough. Although it is not so exaggerated as refreshing, it gives music fans a feeling of freshness and surprise. Indeed, the music on the album is rich in content and contains different genres and themes, some of which can really give music fans a different feeling, much more exciting than J-Game."

Voice of Taipei commented: "The song collection and planning of the whole album are accurate, making the young diva become more feminine. It's well made and, to be honest, a classy Mandarin album." 3C Music commented: "The high selling of Jolin Tsai's album is understandable, sexy image, easy songs and dance moves, stable quality of dance songs and ballads, exquisite packaging are able to make Jolin Tsai popular in Taiwan, the song quality improvement in Dancing Diva is also worthy of appreciation." Shangc.net commented: "Not only R&B style of dance music, but also integration of electronic music and exotic elements make the dance music on the album give people unprecedented innovation in hearing. The trend created by Dancing Diva is a big thing among teenagers back then." Yeh Chun-pu of Music Copyright Society of Chinese Taipei commented: "Dancing Diva created a magnificent new dance music style for Jolin Tsai. It not only became a topic, but also propelled Jolin Tsai to the throne of Golden Melody Award for Best Female Mandarin Singer." Liu Ya-wen, president of the jury of the 18th Golden Melody Awards, commented: "Jolin Tsai led the way with her smart, well-written, and well-sung performances, in particular, Dancing Diva is rich in content, allowing her to break away from an entertainer and become a real singer. She won because of her versatility, and she fits into that all-encompassing trend, especially with the change in music platforms and the proliferation of online downloads." Apple Music Taiwan stated: "The whole album shows a strong exotic flavor in the dynamic dance style. Based on electronic music and pop music, the style of the album is quite diverse. She also won Best Female Mandarin Singer award in the 18th Golden Melody Awards. The title song "Dancing Diva", "A Wonder in Madrid", "Pretence", and other songs stirred up a lot of discussion in the music scene at that time. The strong rhythm, catchy lyrics, and smooth melody are all very impressive."

Accolades 
On August 6, 2006, Tsai won Metro Radio Mandarin Hits Music Awards for Best Asian Singer and Best Stage Performance, "Dancing Diva" won Song of the Year and Top Songs, and "Pretence" won Top Songs. On August 31, 2006, she won an MTV Mandarin Award for Top 20 Singers. On October 28, 2006, she won Global Chinese Music Awards for Top 5 Favorite Female Singers and Top Singer (Taiwan), and "Dancing Diva" won Top 20 Songs. On November 10, 2006, she won China Fashion Awards for Best Female Singer (Hong Kong/Taiwan) and Best Asia Breakthrough Singer. On December 15, 2006, she won a Music Pioneer Award for Favorite Female Singer (Taiwan), and "Dancing Diva" won Top 10 Songs (Mandarin). On January 18, 2007, she won a Canadian Chinese Pop Music Chart Award for Top Female Singer (Mandarin), and "Pretence" won Top 10 Songs (Mandarin). On December 25, 2006, "Dancing Diva" won a China Music Award for Top Songs (Hong Kong/Taiwan). On February 2, 2007, she won a KKBox Music Award for Top Female Singer, the album won Top 10 Albums, "Dancing Diva" and "Pretence" won Top 20 Songs, and "A Wonder in Madrid" won Top 20 Songs and Most Consecutive Weeks at Number One Song.

On February 3, 2007, she won \Hito Music Awards for Best Female Singer, Favorite Female Singer, and Favorite Debut, the album won Most Weeks on Chart Album, and "Dancing Diva" won Top 10 Songs. On February 24, 2007, she won Family Music Awards for Favorite Singer (Taiwan) and Top 10 Singers, the album won Top 10 Album, "Pretence" won Top 10 Song, and "A Wonder in Madrid" won Favorite Karaoke Song. On March 22, 2007, the album won an IFPI Hong Kong Top Sales Music Award for Top 10 Selling Albums (Mandarin). On March 25, 2007, she won a Chinese Top Ten Music Award for Top Singer (Taiwan). On May 4, 2007, the nomination list of the 18th Golden Melody Awards was announced. Tsai was nominated for Best Female Mandarin Singer, the album was nominated for Best Mandarin Album, and Adia was nominated for Best Single Producer for "Dancing Diva". On May 20, 2007, she won Music King Awards for Favorite Female Singer (Taiwan) and Best Stage Performance, and "Dancing Diva" won Top Songs (Mandarin). On June 16, 2007, she won two Golden Melody Awards for Best Female Mandarin Singer and Favorite Female Singer/Group. On June 29, 2007, she won a Music Radio China Top Chart Award for Top Selling Female Singer, the album won Best Album (Hong Kong/Taiwan), and "Dancing Diva" won Top Songs.

Track listing

Release history

References

External links 
 
 

2006 albums
EMI Music Taiwan albums
Jolin Tsai albums